The 1927 Victorian state election was held in the Australian state of Victoria on Saturday, 9 April 1927, to elect the 65 members of the state's Legislative Assembly.

For the first time, a Victorian state election was held on a Saturday, and voting for the Legislative Assembly was compulsory. As a consequence, voter turnout in contested seats increased from 59.24% at the 1924 election to 91.76% at the 1927 election, although the informal vote increased from 1.01% in 1924 to 1.94% in 1927.

Key dates

Results

Legislative Assembly

|}
Notes:
Eight seats were uncontested at this election, and were retained by the incumbent parties:
Labor (4): Footscray, Northcote, Port Melbourne, Richmond
Nationalist (2): Benambra, Polwarth
Country (1): Goulburn Valley
Independents (1): Brighton

Outcome
The Allan Country–Nationalist Coalition Government was defeated, and a minority Labor Government, led by Edmund Hogan, took office, but had to resign following a vote of no confidence in the Legislative Assembly in November 1928.

See also
Candidates of the 1927 Victorian state election
Members of the Victorian Legislative Assembly, 1927–1929
1928 Victorian Legislative Council election

References

1927 elections in Australia
Elections in Victoria (Australia)
1920s in Victoria (Australia)
April 1927 events